The Andhra Pradesh State Civil Supplies Corporation is a state government agency to promote, distribute and sale of food items and other commodities, ensure food quality control in Andhra Pradesh, India.

History 
The corporation was established in the year 1974, as a limited company under the Companies Act 1956. The Share capital of the company is fully contributed by the Government of Andhra Pradesh.

Organisation 
The company is headed by a chairman including 2-8 board of directors. The chairman is appointed by the Government of Andhra Pradesh. The organisation undertakes the public distribution system and market intervention as a measure for controlling prices and also minimum support price as per the orders issued by the Government of Andhra Pradesh.

The organisation is having 439 Mandal level stock points in the state for the storage of stocks.

References

External links 

 Official website

Organisations based in Vijayawada
State agencies of Andhra Pradesh
1974 establishments in Andhra Pradesh
Government agencies established in 1974
State civil supplies departments of India